James Connors was an Irish tenant farmer, murdered in May 1881.

Connors was a tenant at Forgehill, Toolooban, on the estate of Denis St George Daly, 2nd Baron Dunsandle and Clanconal (1810–1893). The farm consisted of fourteen acres. Some months earlier, Lord Dunsandle dismissed a bailiff named Keogh from the farm, and appointed Connors in his place. This led to his death by militant members of the local Land League. The shooting of Connors was witnessed by his wife, who gave contradictory evidence that led to the three men accused being acquitted.

Connors was attended as he died by Father J.A. Pelly, C.C., Kiltullagh, later Parish Priest of Ballymacward. Not more than 25 attended the funeral, the rest staying away out of fear of reprisal. His death was one of many in the Athenry-Loughrea-Gort area during the Land League "war".

See also
 Martin O'Halloran
 Peter Dempsey (Kiltullagh)
 John Henry Blake
 Thomas Henry Burke (civil servant)
 Hubert de Burgh-Canning, 2nd Marquess of Clanricarde

References
 The Land War in South East Galway (1879-1891), a thesis by Anne Finnegan, NUIG
 As The Centuries Passed: A History of Kiltullagh 1500–1900, edited Kieran Jordan, 2000
 The Land Wars, Kevin and Kieran Jordan, in op.cit.
 The District of Loughrea: Vol. I History 1791-1918. 

Irish murder victims
People from County Galway
19th-century Irish people
1881 deaths